The Norwegian Mixed Curling Championship is the national championship of mixed curling (two men and two women) in Norway. It has been held annually since 1995 and organized by the Norwegian Curling Association.

In mixed curling, the positions on a team must alternate between men and women. If a man throws last rocks, which is usually the case, the women must throw lead rocks and third rocks, while the other male member of the team throws second rocks.

List of champions and medallists
The past champions and medalists of the event are listed as follows (in order - fourth/skip, third, second, lead, alternate; skips marked bold):

References

See also
Norwegian Men's Curling Championship
Norwegian Women's Curling Championship
Norwegian Mixed Doubles Curling Championship
Norwegian Junior Curling Championships

Curling competitions in Norway
Recurring sporting events established in 1995
1995 establishments in Norway
National curling championships
Mixed curling

Curling